Vadim Postnikov (birth unknown) is a Russian rugby league footballer who has played in the 2000s.

Background
Vadim Postnikov was born in Moscow, Russia. 
Known for his performances for the RC Lokomotiv Moscow, a many-times champion of Russia. He was selected for Russia  at the 2000 Rugby League World Cup for the 2000 World Cup in England.

References

External links
Vadim Postnikov player profile

Living people
Russia national rugby league team players
Russian rugby league players
Rugby league props
Sportspeople from Moscow
Year of birth missing (living people)
Rugby articles needing expert attention